Macrelmis is a genus of riffle beetles in the family Elmidae. There are at least three described species in Macrelmis.

Species
 Macrelmis moesta (Horn, 1870)
 Macrelmis shoemakei (Brown, 1971)
 Macrelmis texana (Schaeffer, 1911)

References

Further reading

 
 
 

Elmidae